Edward Vernon Utterson  (1775/76 – 14 July 1856) was a British lawyer, literary antiquary, collector and editor. He was a fellow of the Society of Antiquaries, one of the original members of the Roxburghe Club, a member of the Athenaeum Club, Camden Society and Royal Society of Arts, Recorder of Chichester and a Trustee of the Royal Victoria Yacht Club. He went on to become one of the Six Clerks in Chancery, a position which he kept until his retirement on the abolition of the post in 1842, and also founded the Beldornie Press.

Biography

Born in 1775 or 1776 as the first of John Utterson of Fareham, Hampshire (who was the secretary of Sir Edward Vernon) and his wife Elizabeth's ( Elizabeth Rowe) eight children, he was baptised on 14 July 1777 at Holy Trinity church, Gosport. He was educated at Eton College, entered Trinity College, Cambridge on 17 February 1794, and Lincoln's Inn on 31 October 1794. He matriculated from Trinity College in Michaelmas term 1797 and was admitted pensioner on 17 February 1798, graduating Bachelor of Laws in 1801, and being called to the bar as a barrister on 1 February 1802.

He married Sarah Elizabeth Brown (1781–1851) on 2 May 1803; she translated Tales of the Dead in 1813, and together they had several children. He practised in the Court of Chancery and was appointed to be one of the Six Clerks in Chancery in 1815, which post he retained until it was abolished in 1842, whereupon he retired, retaining his full salary. He was appointed Recorder of Chichester in 1817, where his father had been portreeve, and he had been made customer for £12 1s in 1800; he appointed William Johnson of Chichester as his deputy, and continued in the post until he resigned in 1820, at which time the council made a resolution that "At this Assembly this Body entertain a Deep Sense of the Ability, Zeal and impartiality with which Edward Vernon Utterson Esquire has discharged his important Duties as Recorder ... and they feel the most unfeigned regret that Circumstances have compelled him to Resign ..."

Politically, he was "an uncompromising Tory of the old school, and a most implacable enemy of the system of 'retrenchment' which followed in the wake of the passing of the Reform Bill". Utterson lived at 1 Elm Court, Temple, and 19 Great Ormond Street while a member of the Royal Society of Arts from 1805 to 1806, then 32 Great Coram Street, Brunswick Square, London by 1808, 11 South Audley Street from 1820–25, and 32 York Terrace, Regent's Park by 1829, but from about 1835 he resided first at Newport, Isle of Wight, before moving to Ryde, living first at Buckland Grange (which before his time was a farm called Ryde House; this name was transferred to a new house built nearer the sea by George Player), and then building Beldornie Tower, Pelham Field, where he set up the Beldornie Press in 1840. When Edward Dawes was elected Member of Parliament for the Isle of Wight in May 1851 on the principles of free trade, Utterson "took such umbrage that he removed from Ryde", though he and his wife had been registered as living at 16 Suffolk Street, St Martins in the Fields, London, during the 1851 Census, held two months before.

His wife died on 22 September 1851, and after this he held the first sale of his library, from 19 to 27 April 1852. Utterson himself died aged 80 on 14 July 1856 at Upper Brunswick Place, Hove, Brighton, and was buried at Fareham. There are memorial tablets in St Thomas's Church, Ryde, to him and his wife.

Leisure

Collector

Like his father, Utterson was a collector of books, drawings and prints, and has been described as "a book-collector of real importance and high rank. He had taste, knowledge and experience". It is believed that he must have started his collection early in the 19th century, and he was elected a fellow of the Society of Antiquaries in 1807. He was one of the eighteen members who founded the Roxburghe Club at dinner at the St. Albans Tavern, St Albans Street, London, on 17 June 1812, which he remained a member of until his death in 1856.

He edited a number of books from 1812 to 1839, and then founded his own press, Beldornie Press, publishing a number of notable reprints from 1840–1843. These books were printed in very limited numbers, of no more than about twelve to twenty, each copy numbered in print or handwriting. Utterson presented a copy of all of these to John Payne Collier on discovering the interest he had in early English literature. Collier discovered a number of inconsistencies in the books, which he attributed primarily to the scribes and compositors employed by Utterson for Beldornie Press, and published a note to that effect in the 5 January 1856 issue of Notes and Queries, assuming Utterson to be dead. Utterson quickly wrote to him in person, informing him that he was alive and well, and Collier wrote a second note in the next issue, apologising for the confusion. His warning over the accuracy of the Beldornie Press reprints, however, still stands.

Artist
Utterson was also a talented amateur artist, and many of his works remain in the British Museum to this day. He was admitted to draw from the British Museum's Townley Gallery in 1817, which had been opened to allow artists to draw from its ancient sculptures, and met artist James Ward there that year. When he exhibited his work in 1824, he was described as "an imitator as well as an admirer of the compositions of Mr Stothard".

Yachtsman

Utterson owned the yacht Iris of Ryde, and was elected a member of the English division of the Royal Western Yacht Squadron in Portsmouth on 27 October 1835. He was also made a Trustee of the Royal Victoria Yacht Club in Ryde, Isle of Wight.

Sales
As a notable collector, sales of Utterson's books, prints and so on were well advertised events at the time. The first sale of his books ran for eight days from 19 to 27 April 1852, auctioned by S.L. Sotheby & J. Wilkinson, realising £4805, and was followed by the auction of his collection of drawings and engravings.

The second sale of his book collection ran for seven days, from 20 to 27 March 1857, eight months after his death, and amounted to £4050.

Legacy
Literary historian Murray Pittock suggests that Utterson may have been the source of the name of the protagonist of Robert Louis Stevenson's Strange Case of Dr Jekyll and Mr Hyde (1886) – Gabriel John Utterson – a lawyer and close friend of Jekyll in the story.

Bibliography

Works edited
Virgilius. This Boke treateth of the Lyfe of Virgilius, and of his Deth, and many Marvayles that he did in hys Lyfetyme, by Whychcrafte and Nygromancy, thorough the helpe of the Devyls of Hell, London, 1812
The Chronicles of Englande, Fraunce, Spayne, Portyngale, Scotlande, Bretayne, Flaunders & other Places adioynynge, London, 1812
The History of the Valiant Knight Arthur of Little Britain. A Romance of Chivalry. Originally translated from the French by John Bourchier, Lord Berners, London, 1814
According to Thompson Cooper: "This superb edition is illustrated with a series of plates contained in a valuable manuscript of the original romance."
Select Pieces of Early Popular Poetry: republished principally from early printed copies in the Black Letter, 2 vols, London, 1817
Cheuelere Assigne, 1820
Volume 27 of the Roxburghe Club.
A Little Book of Ballads, Newport, Isle of Wight, 1836
Dedicated and presented to the Roxburghe Club as volume 51.
Kyng Roberd of Cysylle, London, 1839

Reprints at Beldornie Press
1840
Arthur Newman, Pleasures Vision, 1619
Samuel Rowlands, Knave of Harts, 1613
1841
Samuel Rowlands, The Melancholie Knight, 1615
Samuel Rowlands, Looke to it: for Ile Stabbe ye, 1604
Richard Linche, Diella: Certaine Sonnets, 1596
Samuel Rowlands, The Knave of Clubbs, 1611
Samuel Rowlands, More Knaues yet? The Knaues of Spades and Diamonds, n.d.
Samuel Rowlands, The Night Raven, 1620
Samuel Rowlands, Good Newes and Bad Newes, 1622
Richard Barnfield, Cynthia, 1593
Patricke Hannay, Songs and Sonnets, 1622
1842
Thomas Middleton, Microcynicon: Sixe Snarling Satyres, 1599
John Maynard, The XII Wonders of the World, 1611
Thomas Bastard, Chrestoleros. Seuen Bookes of Epigrames, 1598
Zepheria, 1594
1843
Certain Elegies done by Sundrie Excellent Wits, 1620
Edward Guilpin, Skialetheia, or A Shadowe of Truth in certaine Epigrams and Satyres, 1599

References

Further reading

Collier, J. Payne "Reprints of Early English Poetry" in Notes and Queries, Series 2, Volume 1, Number 1 (5 January 1856), pp. 6–7
John Payne Collier's reply (8 January 1856), "Reprints of Early English Poetry" in Notes and Queries, Series 2, Volume 1, Number 2 (12 January 1856), p. 37
Monumental Inscriptions – Ryde, St Thomas's Church, Isle of Wight Family History Society
Ulpian in Bibliomania; or Book-Madness by Thomas Frognall Dibdin

People educated at Eton College
1770s births
1856 deaths
People from Fareham
English antiquarians
English editors
Alumni of Trinity College, Cambridge
English art collectors
Law clerks
Year of birth uncertain
Fellows of the Society of Antiquaries of London
English book and manuscript collectors
English barristers